Shrewsbury Castle is a red sandstone castle in Shrewsbury, Shropshire, England. It stands on a hill in the neck of the meander of the River Severn on which the town originally developed. The castle, directly above Shrewsbury railway station, is a Grade I listed building.

History

A castle was ordered on the site by William I c. 1067 - a very early date - but it was greatly extended under Roger de Montgomery circa 1070 as a base for operations into Wales, an administrative centre and as a defensive fortification for the town, which was otherwise protected by the loop of the river. Town walls, of which little now remains, were later added to the defences, as a response to Welsh raids and radiated out from the castle and surrounded the town; the area known as Town Walls still has a small section of them and a single tower, known as Town Walls Tower, which is in the care of the National Trust). In 1138, King Stephen successfully besieged the castle held by William FitzAlan for the Empress Maud during the period known as The Anarchy.

The castle was briefly held by Llywelyn the Great, Prince of Wales, in 1215. Parts of the original medieval structure remain largely incorporating the inner bailey of the castle; the outer bailey, which extended into the town, has long ago vanished under the encroachment of later shops and other buildings. Having fallen into decay after c. 1300 (at the end of the Welsh wars) the castle became a domestic residence during the reign of Elizabeth I and passed to the ownership of the town council c.1600. The castle was extensively repaired in 1643 during the Civil War and was briefly besieged by Parliamentary forces from Wem before its surrender. It was acquired by Sir Francis Newport in 1663. Further repairs were carried out by Thomas Telford on behalf of Sir William Pulteney, M.P. for Shrewsbury, after 1780 to the designs of the architect Robert Adam.

The Shropshire Horticultural Society purchased the castle from a private owner, then Lord Barnard, and gave it to the town in 1924 and it became the location of Shrewsbury's Borough Council chambers for over 50 years. The castle was internally restructured to become the home of the Shropshire Regimental Museum when it moved from Copthorne Barracks and other local sites in 1985. The museum was attacked by the IRA on 25 August 1992 and extensive damage to the collection and to some of the Castle resulted. The museum was officially re-opened by Princess Alexandra on 2 May 1995. In 2019 it was rebranded as the Soldiers of Shropshire Museum.

In 2019 and 2020 an archaeology project by Shropshire Council and the University of Chester undertook excavations in the castle. Work in 2019 found the remains of the original ditch surrounding the motte of c.1067, along with a range of medieval pottery and two arrow heads or crossbow-bolt heads. Excavations in 2020 failed to locate St Michael's chapel, but did recover evidence of 'high-status feasting', including the bones of a pike and possibly a swan.

Collection
The museum combines the collections of the King's Shropshire Light Infantry and the Shropshire Yeomanry. Laura's Tower overlooks the surrounding townscape and countryside and is often used as a backdrop for functions and weddings.

See also
History of Shrewsbury
Listed buildings in Shrewsbury (southeast central area)
King's Shropshire Light Infantry
Ludlow Castle, another English Marches stronghold
One Corpse Too Many - historical fiction based on 1138 battle between King Stephen and supporters of the Empress Maud

References

External links 
Shrewsbury Castle - official site with visiting information and Shropshire Regimental Museum
Shropshire Regimental Museum collections
Dig diaries from the 2019 excavations

Castles in Shropshire
Tourist attractions in Shropshire
Buildings and structures in Shrewsbury
Museums in Shropshire
Grade I listed buildings in Shropshire